The solar eclipse on April 26, 1892 was a total eclipse. A solar eclipse occurs when the Moon passes between Earth and the Sun, thereby totally or partly obscuring the image of the Sun for a viewer on Earth. A total solar eclipse occurs when the Moon's apparent diameter is larger than the Sun's, blocking all direct sunlight, turning day into darkness. Totality occurs in a narrow path across Earth's surface, with the partial solar eclipse visible over a surrounding region thousands of kilometres wide.

Description
The eclipse was visible in many parts of the South Pacific Ocean.  Very few portions occurred over land including New Zealand except for Auckland and the northernmost portion of North Island, islands such as the Chatham Islands, Antipodes, Marquesas Tahiti and Tuamotu, the westernmost fringes of the Antarctica including its peninsula and the westernmost areas of South America including most of the Andes Mountains in Chile, westernmost Argentina, much of Peru, the southwesternmost of Colombia and Ecuador especially the Galapagos. It was part of solar saros 117.

The umbral portion which was as far as 414 km (257 mi) and started at the peninsular portion of Antarctica, the rest was in the Pacific Ocean.  The greatest occurred in the Pacific Ocean at 42.5 S & 119.4 W at 21:55 UTC (1:55 PM local time) and lasted for over 4 minutes.

The eclipse was up to around 20% obscured in many parts of New Zealand and around 10% in Tahiti.

The eclipse started at sunrise in New Zealand and finished at Sunset in South America mainly at a part of the Andes Mountains. The eclipse was obscured by clouds in Dunedin. It was visible from Timaru further north, but was not visible due to clouds on Banks Peninsula. Wellington also experienced heavy cloud cover and the eclipse was thus not visible.

The subsolar marking was at around the 15th parallel north southeast of Hawai'i and northeast of the Palmyra Atoll.

See also 
 List of solar eclipses in the 19th century

References

External links 
 Google interactive maps
 Solar eclipse data

1892 04 26
Solar eclipse of 04 26
1892 in New Zealand
1892 04 26
April 1892 events